Aneurinibacillus tyrosinisolvens is a Gram-positive, strictly aerobic and heterotrophic bacterium from the genus of Aneurinibacillus which has been isolated from seafloor sediments from the Kagoshima Bay.

References

Paenibacillaceae
Bacteria described in 2015